El Cerrito Plaza is a shopping center in El Cerrito, California, a suburb in the San Francisco Bay Area.

Location
El Cerrito Plaza is located on the southern border of El Cerrito (adjacent to the city of Albany) between San Pablo Avenue and the BART rail tracks. Directly to the north is the El Cerrito Plaza BART station.

History

El Cerrito Plaza is located on a part of the June 12, 1834 Rancho San Pablo Mexican land grant to Francisco María Castro.  Several buildings were constructed by the Castro family over the years.  Víctor Castro, Francisco's son,  built his wood frame adobe home here in the early 19th century and it remained standing until it burned down in 1956, shortly before the original shopping center was built. Castro was initially buried, along with four of his children, in what is now the El Cerrito Plaza shopping center. According to Findagrave, Victor's remains were re-interred in the 1950s to the Sunset View cemetery, along with several family members.

During the 1930s, the Castro adobe housed a gambling casino, and the eastern side of the current Plaza housed a dog racing track.  After the track closed, its parking lot housed a trailer park for Kaiser shipyard workers, with the track field area used by El Cerrito High School.  In the late 1940s, a drive in theatre (Cerrito Motor Movies) was built there and operated until the mid-1950s.

El Cerrito Plaza originally opened in 1958 as a  regional mall, centered on a Capwell's department store.

El Cerrito Plaza began to decline with the 1976 opening of Hilltop Mall as well as the opening of other malls in Concord and Walnut Creek. Many shoppers also turned to nearby Fourth Street in Berkeley and retail developments in Emeryville. The closures of the Woolworth's store in 1993 and the Emporium (formerly Capwell's) anchor store in 1996 further accelerated the Plaza's decline.

In 2002, El Cerrito Plaza was partly demolished, remodeled, and reopened in its present form.  The San Francisco Chronicle panned the newly reconstructed Plaza, calling it "in a nutshell, dysfunctional and dull" and an example that "[i]f a city doesn't insist on good development and then stick to its guns, things can go from bad to worse."

In 2003, as part of the renovation, the shopping center's parking lot was drawn back from the edge of channelized Cerrito Creek, which runs along the southern boundary of the Plaza, and marks the boundary separating Alameda and Contra Costa Counties. The creek was re-contoured to give it a more natural flow pattern, planted with native vegetation, and edged with a pathway with seating walls by Friends of the Five Creeks.

Events
A Farmers' Market is held at the Plaza every Tuesday and Saturday.

Stores
The following is a partial listing of retail stores and restaurants at El Cerrito Plaza.

Anchors
Barnes & Noble
CVS Pharmacy
JoAnn Fabrics
Lucky Stores
Petco
Ross Dress For Less
Trader Joe's
Joshua Tree Chiropractic

Restaurants and eateries
Chef's Chinese Food
Jamba Juice
The Junket
Panda Express
Romano's Macaroni Grill
Starbucks
Wing Stop
Yammy Sushi

Services
 Ojas Yoga Center

Other retail stores
AT&T
GameStop
Daiso replaced Pier 1 Imports and opened in the summer of 2016.
See's Candies
T-Mobile
Verizon Wireless
The UPS Store
Mel-O-Dee - Cocktail Lounge

References

External links 
El Cerrito Plaza, Official site.

 El Cerrito Historical Society - Castro Rancho

El Cerrito, California
Shopping malls in the San Francisco Bay Area
Shopping malls in Contra Costa County, California
Shopping malls established in 1958
1958 establishments in California